Caleen Sinnette Jennings is an American actor, director, and playwright. She is a professor of performing arts at American University College of Arts and Sciences. Jennings is the author of the plays "Queens Girl in the World" and "Queens Girl in Africa."

Education 
Jennings completed a Bachelor of Arts in drama from Bennington College. She earned a master of fine arts in acting from New York University Tisch School of the Arts.

Career 
Jennings joined the department of performing arts at American University College of Arts and Sciences in 1989. In 1994, she joined the faculty of the Teaching Shakespeare Institute. At American University, she specializes in playwriting, African American performing arts, Shakespeare performance, and children's theatre. She wrote the semi-autobiographical memoir "Queens Girl in the World." The show debuted at Mosaic Theater Company of DC during the Women's Voices Theater Festival. In 2019, her plays "Queens Girl in the World" and "Queens Girl in Africa" were performed at Everyman Theatre, Baltimore.

Awards and honors 
In 2018, Jennings was nominated for a Helen Hayes Award for her show "Queens Girl in Africa." She was nominated for a 2019 Helen Hayes Charles MacArthur Award for Outstanding Original New Play or Musical.

References 

Living people
Year of birth missing (living people)
21st-century American women writers
American women dramatists and playwrights
21st-century American dramatists and playwrights
African-American dramatists and playwrights
21st-century African-American people
Bennington College alumni
Tisch School of the Arts alumni
American University faculty and staff
African-American actresses
American stage actresses
21st-century African-American women